The Constructional Engineering Union (CEU) was a trade union representing steel erectors and other workers involved in steel construction in the United Kingdom.

History
The union was founded in 1924 as a section of the Iron and Steel Trades Confederation (ISTC).  It left the ISTC and became an independent union in 1930.  In 1971, the union merged with the Amalgamated Union of Engineering and Foundry Workers to form the Amalgamated Union of Engineering Workers, becoming the largely autonomous construction section of the new union.

Election results
The union sponsored a successful Labour Party candidate in several Parliamentary elections.

General Secretaries
1924: George House
1939: Jack Stanley
1957: Ernie Patterson
1968: Eddie Marsden

References

External links
Catalogue of the CEU archives, held at the Modern Records Centre, University of Warwick

Trade unions established in 1924
Trade unions disestablished in 1971
Defunct trade unions of the United Kingdom
Building and construction trade unions
1930 establishments in the United Kingdom
Trade unions based in London